The 2014 ACC women's and men's lacrosse conferences will include Notre Dame and Syracuse after those teams joined the ACC in July 2013. The 2014 ACC women's lacrosse conference will now include eight teams. This will be the only year that the ACC women's lacrosse conference will include these eight teams as Maryland will leave the ACC for the Big Ten at the end of the 2014 season. Boston College plays in the women's ACC conference, but not the men's conference.

The finalists from the 2013 NCAA championship game, Maryland and UNC, are in the ACC conference in 2014. Additionally, Syracuse was in the final four of the 2013 NCAA championship tournament, and UVA and Duke were in the final eight. Syracuse lost to Maryland by a goal in that tournament, while UNC won the championship with a 13-12 victory against Maryland. UNC's victory marked the first championship for that program, and broke Northwestern's two year streak as NCAA champions. Members of the 2014 ACC conference won two of the last four championships, with Maryland beating Northwestern in 2010. Before that Northwestern won five championships in a row.

NCAA tournament performance (last five years)

Returning All-Americans in the ACC

High School matrix

Boston College

Boston College starters

Attack

Midfield

Defense

Face Off

Goalkeeper

Duke

Duke starters

Attack

Midfield

Defense

Face Off

Goalkeeper

Maryland
In the previous season Maryland lost in the final of the NCAA tournament to North Carolina in the third overtime, 12-13. This season Maryland returns 9 of 15 players from that championship game. In comparison, North Carolina returns 12 of 17 players. Maryland was 22-0 going into the final game against North Carolina and had defeated North Carolina twice during the season.

Maryland starters

Attack

Midfield

Defense

Draw

Goalkeeper

North Carolina

North Carolina depth chart
North Carolina won its first championship in 2013 after current head coach Jenny Levy started the school's women's lacrosse program in 1996. In 2014 North Carolina returns 12 of the 17 players in the 2013 championship game. Brittney Coppa, one of UNC's four team captains for 2014 and a three-year starter, will miss the 2014 season after tearing her ACL in January 2014 in a game against the U.S. National Team. Inside Lacrosse ranked UNC's incoming Freshman class as the best in the country.

Attack - starters

Attack - appeared in games in 2014

Midfield

Defense

Goalkeeper

Maggie Bill is a freshman at the University of North Carolina at Chapel Hill who accomplished the rare feat of playing on two varsity college sports teams, the women's lacrosse and soccer teams, that both won national championships in their previous seasons. Bill committed to play both sports in the middle of her sophomore year in high school. She scored 12 goals when she was five years old in her first organized lacrosse game. UNC women's lacrosse Coach Jenny Levy said Bill's high school recruiting video was the best she has ever seen. Bill's soccer team won the state championship in her last two years in high school. She was a first-team All-American in lacrosse in her sophomore year in high school. Bill is the second of six children with two brothers and three sisters.

College career

Soccer: Bill played in 12 of 25 games in her first season at UNC.

Lacrosse: She was the No. 2 incoming freshman in lacrosse in the U.S. and earned a starting spot on UNC's midfield. She practiced with the lacrosse team for two weeks before scoring two goals in a close loss to the U.S. national lacrosse team in an exhibition match. After starting the first game of UNC's lacrosse season, she scored four goals in UNC's sixth game against Penn on March 2, 2014. Womenslax.com named Bill rookie of the week after her performance against Penn.

High School in Long Island
Maggie Bill played for St. Anthony's High School on Long Island, New York in the Nassau Suffolk Catholic High School League. She was a first-team All-American in lacrosse her sophomore year in high school after missing her soccer season due to a torn  ACL. She committed to UNC before her sophomore season in lacrosse. She also played point guard on the basketball team in addition to soccer and lacrosse.

Freshman year: Started on the varsity lacrosse team, suffered a torn ACL in at end of the lacrosse season, lacrosse team won league championship

Sophomore year: missed the soccer season due to a torn ACL, lacrosse team won league championship

Junior year: Won league and state championships in soccer, lacrosse team won league championship, MVP in championship game

Senior year: Won league and state championships in soccer, soccer championship game MVP, lacrosse team won league championship for the sixth straight year. Bill had 65 goals (3.6 per game) and 18 assists (1.0 per game) in lacrosse her senior year.

Notre Dame

Notre Dame starters

Attack

Midfield

Defense

Face Off

Goalkeeper

Syracuse

Syracuse starters

Attack

Midfield

Defense

Face Off

Goalkeeper

Virginia

Virginia starters

Attack

Midfield

Defense

Face Off

Goalkeeper

References

Atlantic Coast Conference women's lacrosse